Caroline Jouisse (born 1 January 1994) is a French swimmer. She participated at the 2016 European Open Water Championships, being awarded the bronze medal in the women's 25 kilometer event. Jouisse participated at the 2022 World Aquatics Championships in the open water swimming competition, winning no medal. In August of 2022, she won the European title and gold medal in the 25 kilometre open water swim at the 2022 European Aquatics Championships in Rome, Italy.

References

External links 

1994 births
Living people
Place of birth missing (living people)
French female long-distance swimmers
French female freestyle swimmers
European Open Water Swimming Championships medalists